Manila paper is a relatively inexpensive type of paper, generally made through a less-refined process than other types of paper, and is typically made from semi-bleached wood fibers. It is just as strong as kraft paper but has better printing qualities, such as stronger pigment retention. Manila paper is buff-colored and the fibers of the paper are usually visible to the naked eye.

Manila is most commonly used for making file folders and envelopes, called Manila folders and Manila envelopes, respectively. Some fashion schools and people in the fashion industry use large rolls of Manila to create finalised clothing patterns. Because the paper is generally inexpensive, it is commonly given to children for making art.

Manila paper was originally made out of old Manila hemp ropes which were extensively used on ships, having replaced true hemp. The ropes were made from abacá or Musa textilis, which is grown in the Philippines; hence the association with Manila, its capital city. Abacá is an exceptionally strong fibre, nowadays used for special papers like tea bag tissue. It is also very expensive, being several times more expensive than woodpulp, hence the change to that fiber for what is still called Manilla—usually with two Ls. More recently new woodpulp has often been replaced with a high proportion of recycled fibers. True Manila hemp folders would have been much tougher and longer lasting than modern folders.

See also
 Card stock
 Manila folder
 Kraft paper

References

Visual arts materials
Children's art
Paper